Petricola is a surname. Notable people with the surname include: 

Emily Petricola (born 1980), Australian Paralympic cyclist
Peter Petricola (born 1983), Italian cricketer